Zeljko Blagojevic is a Bosnian Serb runner who ran over 900 km from Banja Luka, Bosnia to Kosovo as a protest against the 2008 Kosovo declaration of independence. He left on 2008-03-14, covering the distance in less than 9 days.

Blagojević is a four-time winner (2003–05, 2007) of the Fruškogorski maraton, held annually since 1978.  He owns the record for the fastest ever finish in this event.

References

Bosnia and Herzegovina male long-distance runners
Living people
Male marathon runners
People from Čelinac
Serbs of Bosnia and Herzegovina
Year of birth missing (living people)